Sanctuary is the seventh album by trumpeter Dave Douglas and his second live album. It was released on the Japanese Avant label in 1997 and features performances by Douglas, Cuong Vu, Yuka Honda, Anthony Coleman, Mark Dresser, Hilliard Greene, Chris Speed and Dougie Bowne.

Reception
The Allmusic review by Joslyn Layne states "Although Dave Douglas is credited as leader, Sanctuary is not just an album of him supported by a backing band. Instead, Douglas plays as equal member in a project of standout musicians. ...Part abstract space shooting, part late-night dance party, all mixed with the scratching and balladry of outside jazz, Sanctuary is a definite strong addition to any collection that values these musicians, and a good introduction to them for all adventurous listeners ready to jump right in".

Track listing
Part One (Disc 1)
 "Apparition" - 9:07  
 "Three Beasts" - 6:27  
 "Swoon" - 6:57  
 "The Lethe" - 3:48  
 "Dark Wood" - 5:20  
 "The Dome" - 6:35  
 "Heavenly Messenger" - 11:44  
 "Among Frogs" - 4:23 
Part Two (Disc 2)
 "Limbo" - 6:36  
 "The Great Cliff" - 4:43  
 "The Lantern" - 11:52  
 "Mad Dog" - 7:39  
 "The Flower" - 9:13  
 "Contemplation" - 5:50  
 "Coins" - 9:34  
 "Among Stars" - 2:44  
All compositions by Dave Douglas
Part One (Disc 1) recorded at Knitting Factory, New York City on August 6, 1996; Part Two (Disc 2) recorded at Knitting Factory, New York City on August 27, 1996

Personnel
Dave Douglas: trumpet
Cuong Vu: trumpet
Yuka Honda: sampler
Anthony Coleman: sampler
Mark Dresser: bass
Hilliard Greene: bass
Chris Speed: tenor saxophone, clarinet
Dougie Bowne: drums

References 

Dave Douglas (trumpeter) live albums
1997 live albums
Avant Records albums
Albums recorded at the Knitting Factory